Indaw Township  is a township in Katha District in the Sagaing Division of Burma. The principal town is Indaw.

References

External links
Maplandia World Gazetteer - map showing the township boundary

 
Townships of Sagaing Region